The 133rd Infantry Regiment is an infantry regiment in the Iowa Army National Guard. It is represented by the 1st Battalion, 133rd Infantry Regiment, part of the 2nd Infantry Brigade Combat Team, 34th Infantry Division.

History
The 1st Battalion, 133rd Infantry Regiment was originally constituted and organized in May 1861 as an element of the 2nd Iowa Volunteer Infantry and mustered into federal service 27 May 1861. It was mustered out of federal service on 12 July 1865 at Louisville, Kentucky.

The 2nd Iowa Volunteer Infantry was mustered again into federal service on 2 June 1916 at Camp Dodge, Iowa for the Mexican Border and stationed at Brownsville, Texas. The unit was again and mustered out of federal service on 15 January 1917 at Fort Des Moines, Iowa. Soon thereafter, the regiment was again called into federal service on 25 March 1917 and was drafted into federal service on 5 August 1917. It was reorganized and redesignated as the 133rd Infantry and assigned to the 34th Infantry Division on 1 October 1917. It was demobilized on 18 February 1919 at Camp Grant, Illinois.

The regiment was consolidated with the 4th Infantry, Iowa State Guard (organized between 1918 and 1919), and was reorganized and federally recognized on 29 March 1921 as the 134th Infantry with headquarters at Sioux City, Iowa. It was redesignated as the 133rd Infantry and assigned to the 34th Infantry Division on 11 July 1921.

The 133rd Infantry was inducted into federal service on 10 February 1941 at Sioux City, Iowa. It inactivated on 3 November 1945 at Camp Patrick Henry, Virginia. It was reorganized and federally recognized on 25 November 1946 with headquarters at Cedar Falls, Iowa.

The unit was relieved from the 34th Infantry Division on 1 May 1959 and reorganized as the 133rd Infantry, a parent regiment under the Combat Arms Regimental System. The 1st Battalion, 133rd Infantry draws its lineage and honors from that of A Company, 133rd Infantry. Fearing a loss of revenue, Iowa Governor Norman A. Erbe and Adjutant General Junior Miller initially refused to comply with an April 1962 National Guard Bureau order to eliminate one of the three Iowa battle groups of the 34th Infantry Division under the ROAD reorganization. 

Subsequent assignments for the 1st Battalion, 133rd Infantry included the 47th Infantry Division and the 34th Infantry Division. It joined the latter on 10 February 1991, becoming part of the division's 2nd Brigade (Air Assault). With the transformation of the 34th Infantry Division to the US Army's modular force structure and the reorganization and redesignation of 2nd Brigade (Air Assault), 34th Infantry Division as 2nd Brigade Combat Team, 34th Infantry Division, the unit became directly assigned to the new modular brigade combat team.

After completing six months of training at Camp Shelby, Mississippi, and a rotation through Joint Readiness Training Center in Fort Polk, Louisiana, the 1st Battalion, 133rd Infantry, made it safely into the Iraqi theater of operation. The outgoing unit, 1st Battalion, 118th Field Artillery, from Savannah, Georgia, validated the 1st Battalion, 133rd Infantry, as ready to take over the mission. The mission tasked to the 133rd Infantry Battalion was convoy security in the western region of the Iraqi theater of operations. The official take over of this mission occurred on 1 May 2006.

Activated in August 2010 and mobilized out of Camp Shelby, Mississippi, the battalion completed a validation exercise at the National Training Center, Fort Irwin, CA, and was forward deployed to Laghman & Nuristan provinces in Afghanistan. Tasked with conducting Counterinsurgency in support of Unified Land Operations in Regional Command East, the 1-133 Infantry Battalion excelled at lethal and nonlethal targeting to secure the populace, civil-military operations to improve the infrastructure and education, and mentoring host nation forces for eventual hand off of security. After nine months in theatre, the 1-133 Infantry was relieved in place and reverted to state control in August 2011.

Lineage
Organized in the Iowa volunteer militia during 1861 as follows:
 2d Regiment organized 20 April – 6 May 1861 in southeastern Iowa as the 2nd Regiment, Iowa Volunteer Infantry
 3d Regiment organized 18 May – 1 June 1861 in northeastern Iowa as the 3rd Regiment, Iowa Volunteer Infantry
 2d and 3d Regiments, Iowa Volunteer Infantry, mustered into federal service 27–28 May and 8–10 June 1861, respectively, at Keokuk, Iowa
 2d and 3d Regiments consolidated 4 November 1864 and consolidated unit designated as the 2d Regiment, Iowa Volunteer Infantry
 Mustered out of federal service 12 July 1865 at Louisville, Kentucky
 Reorganized 1876-1878 in Iowa as independent companies of volunteer militia
(Iowa State Militia redesignated 3 April 1878 as the Iowa National Guard)
 Companies in central Iowa consolidated 11 September 1879 to form the 8th Infantry Regiment
 Redesignated 1 October 1881 as the 1st Infantry Regiment
 Mustered into federal service 2 June 1898 at Des Moines as the 49th Iowa Volunteer Infantry;
 mustered out of federal service 13 May 1899 at Savannah, Georgia
 Reorganized 30 November 1902 in the Iowa National Guard as the 53d Infantry Regiment
 Redesignated 3 July 1915 as the 1st Infantry Regiment
 Mustered into federal service 26 June 1916 at Camp Dodge, Iowa; mustered out of federal service 15 January 1917 at Des Moines
 Called into federal service 25 March 1917; drafted into federal service 5 August 1917
 Reorganized and redesignated 1 October 1917 as the 133d Infantry and assigned to the 34th Division
 Demobilized 18 February 1919 at Camp Grant (Illinois)
 Former 1st Infantry consolidated with the 4th Infantry Regiment (organized 1918-1919 in the Iowa State Guard); consolidated unit reorganized and federally recognized 1 April 1921 in the Iowa National Guard as the 134th Infantry with headquarters at Des Moines
 Redesignated 11 July 1921 as the 133d Infantry and assigned to the 34th Division (later redesignated as the 34th Infantry Division)
 (Location of headquarters changed 22 September 1927 to Sioux City; on 19 July 1940 to Waterloo)
 Inducted into federal service 10 February 1941 at home stations
 Inactivated 3 November 1945 at Camp Patrick Henry, Virginia
 Reorganized and federally recognized 25 November 1946 in the Iowa National Guard as the 133d Infantry with headquarters at Cedar Falls
 Reorganized 1 May 1959 as a parent regiment under the Combat Arms Regimental System to consist of the 1st and 2d Battle Groups, elements of the 34th Infantry Division
 Reorganized 1 March 1963 to consist of the 1st Battle Group and the 2d Battalion
 Reorganized 1 March 1964 to consist of the 1st, 2d, and 3d Battalions
 Reorganized 1 January 1968 to consist of the 1st and 2d Battalions, elements of the 47th Infantry Division
 (2d Battalion ordered into active federal service 13 May 1968 at home stations; released from active federal service 13 December 1969 and reverted to state control).
Withdrawn 1 May 1989 from the Combat Arms Regimental System and reorganized under the United States Army Regimental System
 Reorganized 10 February 1991 to consist of the 1st and 2d Battalions, elements of the 34th Infantry Division
 Reorganized 1 September 1997 to consist of the 1st Battalion, an element of the 34th Infantry Division
 Ordered into active federal service 15 August 2003 at home stations; released from active federal service 9 May 2004 and reverted to state control
 Redesignated 1 October 2005 as the 133d Infantry Regiment
 Ordered into active federal service 5 October 2005 at home stations; released from active federal service 29 September 2007 and reverted to state control
 Ordered into active federal service 2 August 2010 at home stations; released from active federal service 1 August 2011 and reverted to state control

Distinctive unit insignia
 Description
A Silver color metal and enamel device 1 1/8 inches (2.86 cm) in height overall consisting of a shield blazoned:  Argent, a Spanish castle debased Gules, to chief a fleur-de-lis of the like and on a mount a giant cactus Vert.  Attached below and to the sides of the shield is a Silver scroll inscribed "AVAUNCEZ" in Black letters.
 Symbolism
The shield is silver, or white, the old Infantry color.  The Spanish castle, taken from the Spanish Campaign Medal, is used to represent military service outside the continental limits of the United States, while the cactus and fleur-de-lis are for Mexican Border and World War I service, respectively.  The motto translates to "Advance, or Forward".
 Background
The distinctive unit insignia was approved on 16 August 1933.

Coat of arms
Blazon
 Shield- Argent, a Spanish castle debased Gules, to chief a fleur-de-lis of the like and on a mount a giant cactus Vert.
 Crest- That for the regiments and separate battalions of the Iowa Army National Guard:  On a wreath of the colors Argent and Gules, a hawk’s head erased Proper.  Motto:   AVAUNCEZ (Advance, or Forward).
 Symbolism
 Shield- The shield is white, the old Infantry color.  The Spanish castle, taken from the Spanish Campaign Medal, is used to represent military service outside the continental limits of the United States, while the cactus and fleur-de-lis are for Mexican Border and World War I service, respectively.
 Crest- The crest is that of the Iowa Army National Guard.
 Background- The coat of arms was approved on 15 August 1933.

Campaign streamers
Civil War
 Henry and Donelson
 Mississippi River
 Shiloh
 Vicksburg
 Atlanta
 Missouri 1861
 Tennessee 1862
 Mississippi 1862
 Mississippi 1863
 Georgia 1864
World War I
 Streamer without inscription
World War II
 Tunisia
 Naples–Foggia
 Anzio
 Rome–Arno
 North Apennines
 Po Valley
War on Terror
 Iraq:
 National Resolution
 Iraqi Surge
 Afghanistan

Decorations
 Meritorious Unit Commendation (Army), Streamer embroidered: IRAQ 2006-2007, AFGHANISTAN 2010-2011.
 French Croix de Guerre with Palm, World War II, Streamer embroidered BELVEDERE.
Company A (Clinton), 1st Battalion, additionally entitled to:
 Presidential Unit Citation (Army), Streamer embroidered NORTHERN ITALY (1st Battalion, 133rd Infantry Regiment, 3-4 October 1944, WD GO 113, 1946)

References

 Rush, Robert S. US Infantryman in World War II (2) Mediterranean Theater of Operations 1942-45, Osprey Publishing, 2002.  (Follows a composite soldier of the 133rd from his 1942 enlistment through North Africa to V-E Day to illustrate US Infantry training, equipment and tactics)

External links
 http://www.history.army.mil/html/forcestruc/lh.html 
 https://web.archive.org/web/20120326233231/http://www.iowanationalguard.com/Museum/History.htm
http://www.globalsecurity.org/military/agency/army/1-133in.htm

Iowa Army National Guard
1861 establishments in Iowa
Military units and formations established in 1861
133